The 2004 Auburn Tigers football team represented Auburn University in the 2004 NCAA Division I-A football season.  Auburn compiled a record of 13–0, winning the Southeastern Conference championship and finishing the season ranked #2 in both the AP Poll and the Coaches' Poll.  Beginning the season ranked #17 in the AP poll and #18 in the Coaches' Poll, the Tigers were denied a berth in the BCS National Championship Game because they finished the regular season ranked #3 in the BCS rankings.  Head coach Tommy Tuberville, who was nearly fired after the 2003 season, was named national Coach of the Year by the Associated Press. This was Auburn's third undefeated season in which they played over ten games.

The team defeated LSU, Georgia, and Tennessee (twice, facing them a second time in the SEC Championship game), all of whom were ranked opponents. They were left out of the BCS National Championship Game, and instead went to the 2005 Sugar Bowl, beating #9 Virginia Tech, 16–13, to finish 13–0. USC and Oklahoma played for the national title in the Orange Bowl. USC's national title was later vacated by the NCAA. Both Darryl W. Perry and GBE College Football Ratings awarded their national titles to Auburn.

The team's roster featured four first-round NFL draft picks in running back Carnell Williams, running back Ronnie Brown, defensive back Carlos Rogers, and quarterback Jason Campbell, as well as five future Pro Bowl participants in offensive linemen Marcus McNeill and Ben Grubbs, running back Ronnie Brown, Carlos Rogers, and defensive tackle Jay Ratliff. Permanent team captains were Campbell, Williams, Brown, Rogers, and Bret Eddins.

Schedule

Statistics

Offense
Passing

Roster

- Redshirt

Captains

References

Auburn
Auburn Tigers football seasons
Southeastern Conference football champion seasons
Sugar Bowl champion seasons
College football undefeated seasons
Auburn Tigers football